The Harry S. Truman Scholarship is a highly selective graduate fellowship in the United States for public service leadership. Created as a memorial to Harry S Truman, it is awarded annually to between 50 and 60 students in their third year of undergraduate studies. Many notable individuals have received the fellowship.

1970s 
 Janet Napolitano (1977), Governor of Arizona, 2003–2009, Secretary of Homeland Security under President Barack Obama, 2009–2013, President of the University of California, 2013–2020

1980s 
Stephen Censky (1980), United States Deputy Secretary of Agriculture.
Robert Pape (1980), American political scientist and founder of the Chicago Project on Security and Threats
 Jeffrey Toobin (1980), former senior legal analyst for CNN and staff writer at The New Yorker
 Jason Grumet (1981), President of Bipartisan Policy Center
 Bill de Blasio (1981), New York City Mayor
 Bill Halter (1981), former Lieutenant Governor of Arkansas and U.S. Senate candidate
 George Stephanopoulos (1981), former political adviser to Bill Clinton, current Chief Anchor for ABC News
 Andra Samoa (1982), CEO of American Samoa Power Authority 
 Thomas Sugrue (1982), professor of history and sociology at New York University
 G. Murray Snow (1982), federal judge for the United States District Court for the District of Arizona.
 Chris Coons (1983), U.S. Senator for Delaware
 Russ Dallen (1983), Editor-in-chief of the Latin American Herald Tribune, and previously the Daily Journal
 Dan Gelber, Florida State Senator and Florida Attorney General Candidate.
 Luis Ubiñas (1983), former President of the Ford Foundation
 Lisa Cook (1984), American economist elected to the board of the Federal Reserve Bank of Chicago and nominated to the Board of Governors at the Federal Reserve System
Tanya L. Menton (1984), Assistant General Counsel, The Walt Disney Company
 William W. Mercer (1984), United States Attorney for Montana
 Daniel H. Pink (1984), author of A Whole New Mind; former chief speech writer for Vice President Gore
 Susan E. Rice (1984), 24th National Security Advisor; U.S. Ambassador to the United Nations; former Assistant Secretary of State
 Wayne W. Williams (1985), Colorado Secretary of State
 Tom Malinowski (1985), United States Representative, New Jersey's 7th congressional district
 Ted Deutch (1986), member of U.S. House of Representatives from Florida's 19th congressional district, former Democratic member of the Florida State Senate
 Mark Lemley (1986), Professor of Law, Stanford Law School
 Michelle Alexander (1987), Associate Professor, Ohio State University, civil rights advocate and writer
 Neil Gorsuch (1987), Associate Justice of the Supreme Court of the United States
 Brad Lander (1989), Member of the New York City Council, representing the 39th Council District in Brooklyn
 George Herbert Walker IV (1989), CEO of Neuberger Berman
 Jason Saul (1989), CEO of Mission Measurement, Lecturer of Social Enterprise at Kellogg School of Management

1990s 
 Noah Feldman (1990), Professor of Law, Harvard Law School
 Tomiko Brown-Nagin (1991), American lawyer, historian, and academic administrator; professor of Constitutional Law at Harvard Law School
 Mark Sandy (1991), Deputy Associate Director for National Security, Office of Management and Budget, Executive office of the President, Washington, D.C.
 Rich Constable (1993), former assistant U.S. attorney, Commissioner of the N.J. Department of Community Affairs
 Rachel Paulose (1993), United States Attorney for Minnesota
 Stacey Abrams (1994), Georgia House Minority Leader, 84th district
 Hannah Beech (1994), journalist and The New York Times Southeast Asia Bureau Chief
 William J. Dobson (1994), journalist and author of The Dictator's Learning Curve.
 Amy Finkelstein (1994), MacArthur Fellow and Professor in Economics, Massachusetts Institute of Technology
Heather Mizeur (1994), former member of the Maryland House of Delegates and 2022 candidate for Maryland's 1st Congressional District
 Anjan Mukherjee (1994), former Counselor to the Secretary of the U.S. Treasury
Cara H. Drinan (1995), professor of law at The Catholic University of America's Columbus School of Law
 John Cranley (1995), Cincinnati City Councilmember
 Eric Greitens (1995), 56th Governor of Missouri (2017–2018), Founder of The Mission Continues
 Darci Vetter (1995), former Chief Agricultural Negotiator at USTR, former Deputy Under Secretary for Farm and Foreign Agricultural Services at USDA, former International Trade Advisor at Senate Finance Committee
 Dayne Walling (1995), Mayor of Flint, Michigan
 Jake Zimmerman (1995), Missouri State Representative, 83rd district
 John King Jr. (1995), 10th United States Secretary of Education
 Nicholas Thompson (1996), Editor-in-Chief of Wired
 Phil Carter (1996), Former Deputy Assistant Secretary of Defense for Detainee Affairs
 Corine Hegland (1996), writer, The National Journal, 2006 James Aronson Award for Social Justice Journalism
 Terry Babcock-Lumish (1996), current Executive Secretary of the Truman Foundation.
 Jedediah Purdy (1996), author and Professor, Duke University School of Law
 Brendan Johnson (1997), U.S. Attorney for the District of South Dakota
 Noam Scheiber (1997), reporter on Labor and the Workplace for The New York Times
 Jake Sullivan (1997), United States National Security Advisor
 Leonardo Martinez-Diaz (1998), Deputy Assistant Secretary at United States Department of Treasury, former Fellow and Deputy Director at Brookings Institution
Maria J. Stephan (1998), political scientist and former director of the program on non-violent action at the United States Institute for Peace
 Martina Vandenberg (1998), lawyer and human trafficking activist
 Dusty Johnson (1998), former chief of staff to Governor Dennis Daugaard and chairman of the South Dakota Public Utilities Commission, current member of the United States House of Representatives from South Dakota

2000s 
 Marcia Chatelain (2000), Pulitzer Prize-winning historian, professor of history and African American studies at Georgetown University, and creator of the Ferguson Syllabus
David Haskell (editor) (2000), Editor-in-Chief of New York Magazine; Co-founder of Kings County Distillery
 Jon Favreau (2002), President Barack Obama's Director of Speechwriting, co-founder of Crooked Media
 Cyrus Habib (2002), 16th Lieutenant Governor of Washington
 Heidi Williams (2002), MacArthur Fellow and Professor in Economics, Massachusetts Institute of Technology
 Andy Kim (2003), U.S. Representative from NJ-03 and former National Security Council adviser to President Barack Obama
 Ryan Quarles (2005), Agriculture Commissioner of Kentucky, 2016–present, Kentucky State Representative from District 62, 2011–2016
 Rob Sand (2005), Iowa State Auditor
 Miles Taylor, American government official
 Kesha Ram (2007), Member Vermont House of Representatives
 Warwick Sabin (2007), Member Arkansas House of Representatives
 Emily Calandrelli (2008), Host and producer for Xploration Station

2010s 
 Greg Nance (2010), CEO of Dyad.com and Founder of Moneythink
Michael Tubbs (2011), Former Mayor of Stockton
Andrew J. Lewis (2011), Seattle City Council
Jacob Tobia (2013), LGBT rights activist, writer, producer, and actor
 Zach Wahls (2013), Iowa State Senator
Rana Abdelhamid (2014), Founder of MALIKAH and 2022 candidate for Congress in New York's 12th congressional district
David Shimer (2017), American historian and foreign policy analyst
Jaz Brisack (2018), a founding labor organizer in the Starbucks Workers United unionization campaign

References

Harry S. Truman
Scholarships in the United States